In Search of a Hero is a 1926 American silent comedy film directed by Duke Worne and starring Ashton Dearholt, Jane Thomas, and James Harrison.

Plot
As described in a film magazine review, Percy Browning and Jack Strong are expelled from college, and, to toughen them up, Old Browning sends them to work at his lumber camp. Arriving by train, the two discover that time at the camp is very different from their previous college life. Percy falls in love with Peggy Richmond, whose father is a competitor to the Brownings. The latter's foreman, Big Dan, uses unfair means to block work from the Richmonds. Percy, after being groomed by a pugilist, tackles Big Dan and beats him. After his father arrives, Percy explains everything and they are reconciled. Peggy admits that she loves Percy.

Cast
 Ashton Dearholt as Percy Browning
 Jane Thomas as Peggy Richmond
 James Harrison as Jack Strong
 Garry O'Dell as Dinty
 Al Kaufman as Dugan
 Claire Vinson as Inez
 Les Bates as Big Dan
 Edgar Keller as Man
 George Periolat as French man

References

Bibliography
 Robert B. Connelly. The Silents: Silent Feature Films, 1910-36, Volume 40, Issue 2. December Press, 1998.

External links
 

1926 films
1926 comedy films
1920s English-language films
American silent feature films
Silent American comedy films
American black-and-white films
Films directed by Duke Worne
1920s American films